Logan Park High School is a high school founded in 1974 in Dunedin, New Zealand. It has a roll of around 700 students with a teaching staff of about 50, with some 18 further auxiliary and administrative staff.

History
The school was built on the site of a former rifle range in a small wooded valley adjacent to Logan Park, an area of land reclaimed from the former Lake Logan (itself previously Pelichet Bay) and now largely converted into a park and playing fields in Dunedin North. It admitted third-form students in 1974 and expanded to all forms the following year, when it was formally opened by Phil Amos, the Minister of Education. The city's main athletics and soccer venue, the Caledonian Ground, is located next to the school grounds. Forsyth Barr Stadium at University Plaza and the University Oval cricket ground are also located nearby.

The school developed from an earlier school in central Dunedin, King Edward Technical College, which itself had long links with Otago Polytechnic (which has also previously occupied a central Dunedin site). The school's proximity to the city's tertiary institutions (the University of Otago and Otago Polytechnic) allows the school access to tertiary study facilities it would otherwise not have access to.

Like most New Zealand state secondary schools of the era, Logan Park High School was constructed to the S68 standard plan, characterised by its single-storey classroom blocks of masonry construction, low-pitched roofs and internal open courtyards.

On 17 March 2020, the high school was shut down for 48 hours after one of its students tested positive for the Coronavirus disease 2019. The school's closure was part of the New Zealand Government's heightened health measures in response to the COVID-19 pandemic in New Zealand.

Education
Logan Park has a current roll of  students, and its roll peaked at about 1200 in 1995. The school has a teaching staff of about 35, with some 15 further auxiliary and administrative staff. LPHS is one of the four-state coeducational schools in Dunedin. 

The founding principal was "Arch" Wilson.

Colin Croudis was principal between 1980 until 1992.

In 1998, Jane Johnson was appointed as the school's first female principal. Ms Johnson retired in 2017, and in September of that year, co-principals Peter Hills and Kristan Mouat were appointed.

Logan Park High School combines both a junior and a senior school. Year 9 (Form 3) and Year 10 (Form 4) are the juniors of the school; Years 11 to 13 (Forms 5 to 7) are the seniors of the school. Most senior students sit their NCEA examinations during their time at the school.

Culture
The school's motto, Kua mutu, kua timata is Māori, and means "It is finished, but has again begun" – a reference to the new school rising from the old King Edward Technical College, and also to high school as a transition from childhood to adulthood. The school uniform's colours are black, white and maroon. The uniform is optional in year 13.

The school was divided into five houses although starting in 2008 there have been four, each with its own dean. These houses are named Clayton, Omimi, Aoraki (formerly Aorangi), Toroa and Potiki (although not featuring in the 2008 school year and in subsequent years). As of 2022 each house is split into multiple groups.

Logan Park High School is regarded as important in the history of New Zealand rock music as being one of the elements that made up the Dunedin sound. Many of the musicians who were at the forefront of this movement in the 1980s were pupils of Logan Park when they made their first public musical performances.

Notable alumni

Aldous Harding, musician
Andrew Brough, musician 
Belinda Colling, netball player
Mark Dickel, basketballer
Richard Dickel, basketball coach
Jane Dodd, musician 
Chris Donaldson, athlete
Graeme Downes, musician
Jabez Olssen, film editor
Pip Hall, actor and writer 
Matt Heath, Entertainment 
Joanna Norris, former editor of The Christchurch Press 
Nadia Reid, musician
Helen Varley Jamieson, theatre and digital artist
Kashi Leuchs, cyclist
Tania Murray, athlete
Jesse O'Brien, musician, NZ Idol finalist
Martin Phillipps, musician
Darren Stedman, musician

References

External links
Official School Website

Secondary schools in Dunedin
Educational institutions established in 1975
New Zealand secondary schools of S68 plan construction
1975 establishments in New Zealand